Jean-Paul LeBlanc (August 16, 1923 – November 28, 2021) was a Canadian politician. He served in the Legislative Assembly of New Brunswick from 1970 to 1974 from the electoral district of Moncton, a member of the Progressive Conservative party. LeBlanc died in Moncton, New Brunswick on November 28, 2021, at the age of 98.

References

1923 births
2021 deaths
Acadian people
20th-century Canadian politicians
21st-century Canadian politicians
Progressive Conservative Party of New Brunswick politicians
Members of the Legislative Assembly of New Brunswick
People from Westmorland County, New Brunswick